Mutula Kilonzo Jnr.  is the current Governor of Makueni County government, Kenya. He is a member and vice chair of the Wiper Democratic Movement, Kenya and was elected as the second Senator of Makueni County Government on the WDM-K ticket in a by-election in July 2013, after the demise of his father lawyer Mutula Kilonzo and is currently serving his second term since his election in August 2017. He was elected as the second Governor for Makueni county  in the  August 2022 elections and he is now the current governor of Makueni county, having been sworn to the office 25th August 2022.

Early life and education
Kilonzo Jnr was born in Mbooni, Makueni County  in the year 1975. He was born to Mutula Kilonzo and his first wife. He is a brother to Kethi Kilonzo and Wanza Kilonzo.  Since his father remarried, he has stepbrothers: Mutune, Muathi Kilonzo, Michael Musembi, and Musau. For his secondary school education, he studied in Kathiani High School, Machakos County.  He earned his Bachelor of Laws (LLB) degree from Dr. Ambedkar College, Nagpur.

Controversies surrounding his father's death 

In 2013, Mutula Kilonzo Jnr at the Machakos High court, testified in an inquest into his father's death and indicated there was suspicion on lack of reports about the people close to his father and workers he had made contact within the last days before his death. He claimed that a cover-up had been hatched after a postmortem was conducted at the Lee Funeral Home, in a bid to protect the perpetrators. The police, however, ruled out foul play saying that the autopsy conducted revealed that Mutula Kilonzo died of natural causes and had excessive internal bleeding due to the high blood pressure he was suffering as indicated by the internal organs. The police further indicated that they had interviewed all the persons at Mutula's Maanzoni Residence, where he met his death. This was followed by a tough tussle in court between Nduku Kilonzo, Mutula's second wife, and the children about the execution of the late lawyer's will. The will according to Mutula Kilonzo, Nduku Kilonzo and Kilonzo Musembi, his father were the only sole executors of the will, against Nduku's proposal of single-handedly executing herself that the children were against. They finally resorted to solving the dispute out of the courts.

Professional career 
Mutula Kilonzo Jnr is a professional lawyer and a certified public secretary. He serves as an advocate of the High Court of Kenya. He is also an associate of the Chartered Institute of Arbitrators, Kenya. He began his career as an apprentice in his father's firm, Kilonzo and Company Advocates, in 1995. He became an associate at the firm in 2001.

Political career
Mutula Kilonzo Jnr first came to the political limelight in July 2013, after his father, Mutula Kilonzo, passed on while in office and serving as the then-Senator of Makueni County. He was selected as the Wiper Party flag bearer after his sister, lawyer Kethi Kilonzo, who was the initial and first choice to take after their father, was barred by the Independent Electoral and Boundaries Commission from contesting the elections on the grounds that she was not a registered voter, affirmed by a three-judge bench of the High Court of Kenya. He contested in the by-elections that were held thereafter using the Wiper Democratic Movement, Kenya ticket which he won with 163, 232 votes, beating Philip Kaloki of the NARK Party, who was second with 9, 762 votes, John Harun Mwau of PICK party came third with 6, 431 votes, Urbanus Muthoka, who was an independent candidate garnered 517 votes and Jane Kitundu of Labour Party was last with 387 votes.
Here is a breakdown of the results from the by-election:

He became an active member of the Coalition For Reforms and Democracy, which the Wiper Democratic Movement Kenya was affiliated to. Kilonzo ran for the second term in August 2017. He won the seat and is currently serving his second term as the Senator of Makueni County.

Throughout his term as Senator, Mutula Kilonzo Jnr has emerged as a fierce critic of corruption in various arms of the Kenya Government.

Recognition
He has been recognized for his services:.
As a member of the Young Lawyers Committee of the Law Society of Kenya.
As a member of the Committee on Justice, Legal Affairs and Human Rights.

References

Living people
1975 births
21st-century Kenyan lawyers
Members of the Senate of Kenya
People from Makueni County